The brambling (Fringilla montifringilla) is a small passerine bird in the finch family Fringillidae.   It has also been called the cock o' the north and the mountain finch. It is widespread and migratory, often seen in very large flocks.

Taxonomy
In 1758 Linnaeus included the species in the 10th edition of his Systema Naturae under its current binomial name, Fringilla montifringilla.  Montifringilla is from Latin mons, montis mountain and fringilla finch. The English name is probably derived from Common West Germanic *brâma, meaning bramble or a thorny bush (compare Standard German Brämling with the same meaning).

Description
The brambling is similar in size and shape to a common chaffinch. Breeding-plumaged male bramblings are very distinctive, with a black head, dark upperparts, orange breast and white belly. Females and younger birds are less distinct, and more similar in appearance to some chaffinches. In all plumages, however, bramblings differs from chaffinches in a number of features:
 the brambling has a white rump, whereas that of the common chaffinch is grey-green;
 the breast is orange, contrasting with a white belly, on the brambling, whereas on the common chaffinch, the underparts are more uniformly coloured (pink or buff);
 the brambling's scapular feathers are orange, whereas the common chaffinch's are grey or grey-brown;
 the flanks are dark-spotted on the brambling, plain on the common chaffinch;
 bramblings lack the white outer tail feathers of common chaffinches.

An additional difference for all plumages except breeding-plumaged males is the bill colour - yellow in the brambling, dull pinkish in the common chaffinch (breeding-plumaged male bramblings have black bills, common chaffinches in the corresponding plumage have grey bills).

Measurements:

 Length: 16 cm
 Weight: 23-29 g
 Wingspan: 25–26 cm

Distribution and habitat

This bird is widespread, in the breeding season, throughout the forests of northern Europe and east across the Palearctic. It is migratory, wintering in southern Europe, North Africa, northern India, northern Pakistan, China, and Japan.  It frequently strays into Alaska during migration and there are scattered records across the northern United States and southern Canada. The global population of bramblings is about 100 to 200 million, with a decreasing trend.

Open coniferous or birch woodland is favoured for breeding.

Behaviour and ecology

This species is almost entirely migratory. In Europe, it forms large flocks in the winter, sometimes with thousands or even millions of birds in a single flock. Such large gatherings occur especially if beech mast is abundant. Bramblings do not require beech mast in the winter, but winter flocks of bramblings will move until they find it. This may be an adaptation to avoid competition with the common chaffinch. Bramblings mostly eat seeds in winter, but insects in summer. It builds its nest in a tree fork, and decorates the exterior with moss or lichen to make it less conspicuous. It lays 4–9 eggs.

References

External links

Internet Bird Collection: Brambling
Audio recordings from Xeno-canto
Stamps Belgium, China, Taiwan

Fringilla
Birds of Asia
Birds of Europe
Birds described in 1758
Taxa named by Carl Linnaeus